The High School Music Contest, also known as Fizy High School Music Contest for sponsorship reasons, is an annual music contest that is organized in Turkey with the participation of high school students. It started to be held in 1998 by the Kadıköy Municipality Health and Social Solidarity Foundation (Kadıköy Belediyesi Sağlık ve Sosyal Dayanışma Vakfı, KASDAV), and was open to the high schools in Istanbul. In the following years, some award winners started to represent Turkey in various international contests. At the 13th contest which was held in 2010, Eti Crax became the first named sponsor of the event. Starting from the 14th contest in 2011, Vodafone was the main sponsor, and remained so until 2016. Since the 15th contest in 2012, it is open to the participation of high schools from all around the country. The final stages have been held at the Bostancı Show Center in Kadıköy, Istanbul, while the one in 2016 was held at the Volkswagen Arena Istanbul. Fizy became the main sponsor of the event in 2017.

Contests

1st Istanbul High School Music Contest 
It was held in 1998 at the Bostancı Show Center in Kadıköy, and organised by the Kadıköy Municipality Health and Social Solidarity Foundation (Kadıköy Belediyesi Sağlık ve Sosyal Dayanışma Vakfı, KASDAV). It was only open to the participation of high schools from Istanbul. There were only two award categories, the Pop Arrangement Award and the Pop Performance Award.

2nd Istanbul High School Music Contest 
After the qualifications that were held between March 8–10, 16 high schools that were selected by the jury members contested in the final stage on March 17. The final results were:

3rd Istanbul High School Music Contest 
It was held between March 21–30, 2000 with the participation of 19 high schools, and had 9 award categories while two of them were special prizes. The final results were:

4th Istanbul High School Music Contest 
It was held on March 30, 2001 and was hosted by DJ Füsun Tuncer. The final results were:

5th Istanbul High School Music Contest 
The qualifications were held between March 19–21 with the participation of 34 high schools, and the finale was held on March 28, 2000 with the participation of 22 high schools. It was hosted by DJ Füsun Tuncer and Ataman Erkul.

6th High School Music Contest 
The qualifications were held between March 18–19, and the finale was held on March 27, 2003. The final stage which was hosted by DJ Füsun Tuncer and Ataman Erkul witnessed the participation of 36 high schools. The final results were:

7th High School Music Contest 
The final stage was held on March 28, 2004, and consisted of two sections, music and show dance, and saw the participation of 26 and 5 high schools respectively. The final results were:

8th High School Music Contest 
The qualifications were held between March 19–20, and the finale was held on March 26, 2005. The winner of the Best Singing Performance category represented Turkey at the 1st World High School Music Contest, the winners of the Best Male Singer and the Best Female Singer categories represented Turkey at the International Song Contest in Malta.

9th High School Music Contest 
The qualifications were held between March 24–26, and the finale was held on April 8, 2006. The final results were:

10th High School Music Contest 
The finale of the contest was held on April 28, 2007 and saw the participation of 36 high schools. The winner of the Best Female Singer category represented Turkey at the 5th Alexandria International Song Festival in Egypt in July 2007, and the winner of the Best Male Singer category represented Turkey at the Amberstar 2007 in Latvia in August 2007. The final results were:

11th High School Music Contest 
The qualifications were held between March 7–9, and the finale was held on March 29, 2008. 106 high schools participated in the contest while 35 of them made it to the finale. The final results were:

12th High School Music Contest 
With the participation of 132 high schools, the qualifications were held between March 13–15, and the finale was held on April 11, 2009. The final results were:

13th High School Music Contest 
The qualifications were held between March 6–7, and the finale was held on March 27, 2010. The event was labeled as the 13th Eti Crax High School Music Contest (13. Eti Crax Liselerarası Müzik Yarışması) for sponsorship reasons. The final results were:

14th High School Music Contest 
The qualifications, which saw the participation of 131 high schools, were held between March 12–13, and the finale was held on April 27, 2011. Starting from this event, Vodafone became the main sponsor of the contest. After the finale, in which 33 high schools participated, the winners of the Best Singing Performance, the Best Male Singer and the Best Female Singer categories took part in various other music contests. The final results were:

15th High School Music Contest 
The event was named after Vodafone Freezone, for sponsorship reasons, and for the first time high schools out of Istanbul joined the contest. The qualifications in İzmir were held between March 10–11 with the participation of 59 high schools, the qualifications in Ankara on March 17 with the participation of 56 high schools, and the qualifications in Istanbul between March 23–25 with the participation of 159 high schools. The finale was held on April 14, at the Bostancı Show Center. The final results were:

16th High School Music Contest 
The event was organized by Vodafone Freezone and named after it. For the first time, the competition was open to the participation of the high schools from all around Turkey. The qualifications were held in Antalya, İzmir, Ankara, Gaziantep, Istanbul and Bursa respectively in February, March and April with the participation of 424 high schools from 53 provinces of Turkey. The finale was held on April 27, 2013 and saw 23 high schools competing, including the winner of the 1st Northern Cyprus High School Music Contest. The final results were:

17th High School Music Contest 
It was organised under Vodafone Freezone's name. The qualifications were held in Ankara, Adana, Istanbul and İzmir with the participation of 378 high schools from 45 provinces. 23 high schools contested in the finale on April 26, 2014. The final results were:

18th High School Music Contest 
It was organised by Vodafone Freezone and named after it. The qualifications were held in Ankara, Istanbul and İzmir. For the first time, the winners of high school music contest in Germany, Italy, Lebanon, Macedonia and Malta participated and competed in a different category. The finale was held on May 9 and the results were:

19th High School Music Contest 
It was organised under Vodafone Freezone's name, the main sponsor of the event. The qualifications were held in Ankara, Istanbul and İzmir, in which 415 high schools from 53 provinces participated. The finale was held on April 29, 2016 with the participation of 30 high schools. Participants from another countries competed in a separate category in the finale. Volkswagen Arena Istanbul hosted the final for the first and only time. The final results were:

20th High School Music Contest 
It was organised under Fizy's name, the main sponsor of the event. The qualifications in Istanbul were held between March 24–25, in Ankara on March 31, and in İzmir on April 7 with the participation of 465 high schools from 49 provinces. The finale was held in the Bostancı Show Center on April 22 with the participation of 34 high schools. The final results were:

21st High School Music Contest 
The event was organised by Fizy, and the qualifications in Istanbul were held between March 23–24, in Ankara between March 30–31, and in İzmir between April 6–7 with the participation of 557 high schools from 49 provinces. The finale, during which Nükhet Duru received the Legend of Pop Award, was held in the Bostancı Show Center on April 28 with the participation of 35 high schools. The final results were:

22nd High School Music Contest 
It was organised under Fizy's name, and the qualifications in Istanbul were held between March 22–24, in Ankara between March 29–30, and in İzmir between April 5–6 with the participation of 636 high schools from 55 provinces. The finale was held in the Bostancı Show Center on April 27 with the participation of 31 high schools. The final results were:

Notes

References

External links 

 

Song contests
Entertainment events in Turkey
Turkish music
Culture in Ankara
Culture in Istanbul
Culture in İzmir
Events in Istanbul
Recurring events established in 1998
1998 establishments in Turkey
Events in İzmir
Events in Ankara